The 1946 South American Basketball Championship for Women was the first edition and first regional tournament for women in South America. It was held in Santiago, Chile and won by Chile. Four teams competed.

Final rankings

Results

Each team played the other teams once, for a total of three games played by each team.  The top three teams received medals.

External links
FIBA Archive

1946
1946 in women's basketball
International women's basketball competitions hosted by Chile
1946 in Chilean sport
Sports competitions in Santiago
1940s in Santiago, Chile
May 1946 sports events in South America